Henry Donnel Foster (December 19, 1808 – October 16, 1880) was a Democratic member of the U.S. House of Representatives from Pennsylvania.

Biography
Henry D. Foster (cousin of John Cabell Breckinridge) was born in Mercer, Pennsylvania.  He pursued classical studies, and graduated from the College of Meadville.  He studied law, was admitted to the bar in 1829 and commenced practice in Greensburg, Pennsylvania.

Foster was elected as a Democrat to the Twenty-eighth and Twenty-ninth Congresses.  He served as a member of the Pennsylvania State House of Representatives in 1857 and 1858.  He was an unsuccessful candidate for election to Congress in 1858.  He was also an unsuccessful candidate for Governor in 1860.  He unsuccessfully contested the election of John Covode to the Forty-first Congress.  Foster was again elected to the Forty-second Congress.  He was an unsuccessful candidate for reelection in 1872.  He resumed the practice of law in Greensburg.  He moved to Irwin, Pennsylvania, in 1879 and died there in 1880.  Interment in St. Clair Cemetery in Greensburg.

Sources

The Political Graveyard

1808 births
1880 deaths
People from Mercer, Pennsylvania
Democratic Party members of the Pennsylvania House of Representatives
Pennsylvania lawyers
Democratic Party members of the United States House of Representatives from Pennsylvania
19th-century American politicians
19th-century American lawyers